High Blantyre railway station served the town of Blantyre, South Lanarkshire, Scotland from 1863 to 1945 on the Hamilton and Strathaven Railway.

History 
The station was opened on 2 February 1863 on the Hamilton and Strathaven Railway. At the south end was the signal box and on both sides were sidings. The station closed on 1 October 1945.

References 

Disused railway stations in South Lanarkshire
Railway stations in Great Britain opened in 1863
Railway stations in Great Britain closed in 1945
1863 establishments in Scotland
1945 disestablishments in Scotland
Blantyre, South Lanarkshire